The Andreotti IV Cabinet, led by Giulio Andreotti, was the 34th cabinet of the Italian Republic.

The government obtained confidence on 16 March 1978 in the Chamber of Deputies with 545 votes in favor, 30 against and 3 abstentions, and in the Senate with 267 votes in favor and 5 against.

Despite the dissolution of the reserve by Andreotti and his oath in the hands of President Leone, the birth of the government was uncertain until the night before of his presentation in Parliament. The wide and above all rapid trust given to the government was also the result of the climate of emergency in which Montecitorio was found at the news that, an hour before the opening of the session, the Red Brigades had kidnapped the President of the Christian Democracy Aldo Moro and killed the men of his escort. Moro was also assassinated on 9 May 1978.

Composition

|}

References

Italian governments
1978 establishments in Italy
1979 disestablishments in Italy
Cabinets established in 1978
Cabinets disestablished in 1979
Andreotti 4 Cabinet